The Huron Phillies was a primary name of a minor league baseball teams based Huron, South Dakota between 1920 and 1970. Huron teams last played in the Northern League from 1965 to 1970. Previous Huron minor league teams played as members of the Dakota League in 1920, South Dakota League in 1921 and Basin League 1954 to 1962. 

Huron was a minor league affiliate of the Philadelphia Phillies from 1965 to 1968 and Chicago Cubs from 1969 to 1970.

History
The Huron Phillies began minor league play as members of the Northern League in 1965. Huron had previously hosted the Huron Packers, who played as members of the charter members of the South Dakota League in 1920 and Dakota League in 1921. Huron was a minor league affiliate of the Philadelphia Phillies from 1965 to 1968 and Chicago Cubs in 1969 and 1970, playing the last two seasons as the Huron Cubs . The Huron minor league franchise folded following the 1970 season and the Northern League folded in 1971.

The ballpark
Huron teams were noted to have played minor league home games at Memorial Park Stadium. Memorial Park Stadium is still in use today, located at 390 Jersey Avenue NE, Huron, South Dakota.

Timeline

Year-by-year record

Notable alumni

Pat Bourque (1969)
Bill Bonham (1970)
Bill Champion (1965)
Mike Compton (1965)
 Larry Cox (1966)
Red Fisher (1921, MGR)
 Dallas Green (1968, MGR) Manager: 1980 World Series Champion - Philadelphia Phillies; Philadelphia Phillies Wall of Fame
 Toby Harrah (1967) 4x MLB All-Star; Texas Rangers Hall of Fame
Jesús Hernáiz (1969)
 Larry Hisle (1966) 2x MLB All-Star; 1977 AL RBI Leader
 Greg Luzinski (1968) 4x MLB All-Star; Philadelphia Phillies Wall of Fame
 Dyar Miller (1968)
 Rick Reuschel (1970) 3x MLB All-Star; San Francisco Giants Wall of Fame
Ken Reynolds (1966)
Bill Shipke (1920, MGR)
Thomas Silicato (1965)
Art Thomason (1920)
 Andre Thornton (1967) 2x MLB All-Star; Cleveland Indians Hall of Fame
 Jim Todd (1969)
 Manny Trillo (1968) 4x MLB All-Star
 John Vukovich (1966) 
Mutt Wilson (1920)
Mel Wright (1969, MGR)

See also
Huron Phillies playersHuron Cubs playersHuron Packers players

References

Defunct minor league baseball teams
Chicago Cubs minor league affiliates
Philadelphia Phillies minor league affiliates
Professional baseball teams in South Dakota
Northern League (1902-71) baseball teams
Baseball teams established in 1965
Sports clubs disestablished in 1970
1965 establishments in South Dakota
1970 disestablishments in South Dakota
Huron, South Dakota
Defunct baseball teams in South Dakota
Baseball teams disestablished in 1970
Baseball teams established in 1920